Hampshire High School is the name of high schools in several U.S. states:

Hampshire High School (Illinois), Hampshire, Illinois
Hampshire High School (West Virginia), Romney, West Virginia
Hampshire Regional High School, Westhampton, Massachusetts